In algebraic geometry, the Cayley surface, named after Arthur Cayley, is a cubic nodal surface in 3-dimensional projective space with four conical points. It can be given by the equation

when the four singular points are those with three vanishing coordinates. 
Changing variables gives several other simple equations defining the Cayley surface.

As a del Pezzo surface of degree 3, the Cayley surface is given by the
linear system of cubics in the projective plane passing through the 6 vertices
of the complete quadrilateral. This contracts the 4 sides of the complete
quadrilateral to the 4 nodes of the Cayley surface, while blowing up its 6
vertices to the lines through two of them. The surface is a section through the Segre cubic.

The surface contains nine lines, 11 tritangents and no double-sixes.

A number of affine forms of the surface have been presented. Hunt uses 

by transforming coordinates  to 
and dehomogenizing by setting . A more symmetrical form is

References

External links
Cayley’s Nodal Cubic Surface, John Baez, Visual Insight, 15 August, 2016	
Cayley Surface on MathCurve.

Algebraic surfaces
Complex surfaces